"Firth of Fifth" is a song by the British progressive rock band Genesis. It first appeared as the third track on the 1973 album Selling England by the Pound, and was performed as a live piece either in whole or in part throughout the band's career.

Composition 

The title is a pun on the estuary of the River Forth in Scotland, commonly known as the Firth of Forth.  Though the song is credited to the entire band, most of the music was composed by keyboardist Tony Banks. He had written the bulk of the song by 1972, presenting it as a candidate for the album Foxtrot (1972), but it was rejected. He redesigned the piece, which the group accepted as a candidate for Selling England by the Pound. Banks, who worked on the lyrics with Mike Rutherford, later dismissed them, saying they were "one of the worst sets of lyrics [I have] been involved with".

The song starts out with a classical-style grand piano introduction played by Banks. This section changes tempo and segues into the first section of lyrics, accompanied by Phil Collins on drums and a chord progression between the Hammond organ (Banks) and guitar (Steve Hackett).

This leads into a flute melody played by Peter Gabriel, followed by a synth-driven instrumental section which restates the opening piano theme. Hackett then plays the flute melody using violin-like guitar tones. Peter Gabriel sings a brief section of lyrics before Banks concludes the song on piano.

Live performances 

From autumn 1973 onwards, the song's piano intro was omitted during live performances. Banks felt he could not play the introduction effectively live, as he used an RMI electric piano on stage, which was not touch-sensitive. The song survived the departure of Peter Gabriel in 1975, with Phil Collins taking over to sing lead, but was dropped as a piece overall following Hackett's departure in 1977. It was reinstated for the 1981 tour, and performed for the Six of the Best reunion show in 1982.

A 1981 live recording from the Savoy in New York was included as the B side of the UK release of the 12" single of "That's All".

The instrumental section of the song, featuring the guitar solo, was resurrected for the Mama Tour in 1983-84, as well as the We Can't Dance tour in 1992, with touring member Daryl Stuermer playing Hackett's guitar parts. This section of the song featured on the Calling All Stations tour in 1998, with Anthony Drennan playing guitar. It was resurrected for the 2007's Turn It On Again: The Tour and in 2021–22 during the Last Domino? Tour, again featuring Stuermer with Collins's son Nic playing drums during the latter tour. The instrumental segues directly into "I Know What I Like (In Your Wardrobe)" in the 1992, 2007 and 2021–22 versions.

Hackett has continued to play the song live since leaving Genesis. It appears on his solo album of re-worked Genesis songs, Watcher of the Skies: Genesis Revisited (1996) and The Tokyo Tapes (1998), with John Wetton singing and playing bass on both versions. The song was also included as an encore on his Genesis Revisited tour (2013-2014), featured on the live album Genesis Revisited: Live at Hammersmith (2013) and also on Selling England By The Pound & Spectral Mornings: Live At Hammersmith (2020).

Reception 
The song has had a strong critical response as one of the best examples of progressive rock. Particular highlights of the track include Banks' piano introduction and Hackett's guitar solo. Rock author Edward Macan describes "Firth of Fifth" as "one of the finest nine and half minutes of music that Genesis ever put down". Genesis biographers Dave Bowler and Bryan Dray describe Hackett's solo as "the crowning moment of Hackett's time with the band."

Hackett has spoken favourably about his contributions to the song, saying "it'll always be twinned with me, and I still enjoy playing it. It's a great melody for guitar".

References 
Citations

Bibliography

 
 
 
 

Genesis (band) songs
1973 songs
Songs written by Steve Hackett
Songs written by Tony Banks (musician)
Songs written by Phil Collins
Songs written by Peter Gabriel
Songs written by Mike Rutherford